Operation Happy New Year is a 1996 Russian comedy film, a follow-up to the Peculiarities of National Hunt,  directed by Aleksandr Rogozhkin.

Starring the film are Alexey Buldakov, Sergei Makovetsky, Leonid Yarmolnik,  Andrey Krasko and Viktor Bychkov.

Cast
The hunters meet in an emergency room on a New Year's Eve. Various misfortunes bring these people together, but it is the holidays, and the party must go on! You will learn a few things from the film: for example, how to drink vodka yin and yang style, or why vodka without beer is a waste of money.

External links

 Trailer and Screenshots

Operation "Happy New Year!"
Films directed by Aleksandr Rogozhkin
1996 comedy films
Russian comedy films
Films set around New Year